R371 road may refer to:
 R371 road (Ireland)
 R371 road (South Africa)